Huiberdina Krul-van der Nolk van Gogh (22 May 1922 – 5 December 1994) was a Dutch gymnast. She competed at the 1952 Summer Olympics in all artistic gymnastics events and finished in 6th place in the team portable apparatus and in 14th place in team all-round.

References

1922 births
1994 deaths
Dutch female artistic gymnasts
Gymnasts at the 1952 Summer Olympics
Olympic gymnasts of the Netherlands
Gymnasts from The Hague
20th-century Dutch women